Date rape is a rape in which there has been some sort of romantic or potentially sexual relationship between the two parties.

Date rape may refer to:

Date rape drug, an incapacitating agent that may be used to commit rape
"Date Rape" (song) by the band Sublime
Daterape, an album by Thighpaulsandra